Phaedyma shepherdi, the common aeroplane, is a medium-sized butterfly of the family Nymphalidae found in Australia.

References

Butterflies of Australia
Limenitidinae
Taxa named by Frederic Moore